Various cenotaphs have been erected in Northern Ireland: the UK National Inventory of War Memorials provides comprehensive details of each monument in their Online Database (links provided). A private website also maintains very detailed information on a number of these monuments.

Most communities in Northern Ireland can account for losses in the conflicts of the 19th and 20th centuries especially the World Wars. To honour those that died, it was common practice for communities to contribute toward a fund to build a memorial or cenotaph. These cenotaphs are often quite striking and frequently the only decorative or sculptural structures to be seen in smaller settlements. Such cenotaphs are rarely the only memorial erected by a community: stained glass windows, plaques and similar artifacts can be found in churches and other public buildings. Indeed, often buildings themselves, especially British Legion Halls, or gardens were constructed as memorials too.

References 

Monuments and memorials in Northern Ireland
Cenotaphs in the United Kingdom